Avo Paistik (21 April 1936 − 3 December 2013) was an Estonian cartoonist, author, illustrator, film director, painter and pastor.

Born in Tallinn, Paistik animation short film credits included Lend, Tolmuimeja, Klaabu, Nipi ja tige kala, Klaabu kosmoses, Naksitrallid and Naksitrallid II. He left animation in 1991 to become a pastor.

Avo Paistik died of an undisclosed disease-related cause on 3 December 2013, aged 77.

References

External links

1936 births
2013 deaths
Artists from Tallinn
People from Tallinn
Disease-related deaths in Estonia
Estonian film directors
Estonian cartoonists
Estonian animators
Estonian illustrators
20th-century Estonian writers
20th-century Estonian painters
20th-century Estonian male artists
21st-century Estonian painters
Estonian animated film directors
Burials at Liiva Cemetery